"Do Nothing till You Hear from Me" (also written as "Do Nothin' Til You Hear from Me") is a song with music by Duke Ellington and lyrics by Bob Russell. It originated as a 1940 instrumental ("Concerto for Cootie") that was designed to highlight the playing of Ellington's lead trumpeter, Cootie Williams. Russell's words were added later.  In 1944, Ellington's own recording of the song was a number one hit R&B chart for eight non-consecutive weeks and number six on the pop chart.

Other recordings to reach the Billboard charts in 1944 were by Woody Herman and by Stan Kenton (vocal: Red Dorris).

Other versions
"Do Nothing till You Hear from Me" has since been performed by many other famous musical artists, including: 
Nat King Cole, 1944, with The King Cole Trio
Billie Holiday, 1944 - Live, 1955, Studio, Stay With Me
Lena Horne, 1944, appears on her 2002 compilation album The Young Star
Patti Page, 1949, released in 1986 on The Uncollected Patti Page (1949): Patti Page with Lou Stein's Music
Hampton Hawes, 1956 - All Night Session! Vol. 3
Bing Crosby recorded the song in 1957 for use on his radio show and it was subsequently included in the album Shall We Dance? (2012). 
Ella Fitzgerald, 1957, Ella Fitzgerald Sings the Duke Ellington Song Book
Mose Allison, 1959 - Autumn Song
Louis Armstrong and Duke Ellington, 1961, The Great Summit
Frances Faye, 1962, Swinging All the Way with Frances Faye
Al Hirt, 1962, Horn-A-Plenty
Joni James, 1962, After Hours
Don Lamond & His Orchestra, 1962, Off Beat Percussion
Anita O'Day, 1962, All the Sad Young Men
Nina Simone, 1962, Nina Simone Sings Ellington
Dinah Washington, 1962, In Love
Sammy Davis Jr. (with Sam Butera & the Witnesses, 1965, When the Feeling Hits You!
Cal Tjader & Carmen McRae, 1982, Heat Wave
Keith Jarrett, 1987, Solo Tribute
Harry Connick Jr., 1988, 20
Robert Palmer, 1992, Ridin' High
Diana Krall, 1993, Stepping Out
Phil Collins, 1995, from Quincy Jones's album Q's Jook Joint
Tony Bennett, 1999, Bennett Sings Ellington: Hot & Cool
Dr. John, 1999, Duke Elegant - 
Silje Nergaard, 2000, Port of Call
Andy Williams, 2000, Released on his 2001 live album Andy Williams Live
Mary J. Blige, 2001, Red Hot + Indigo
Robbie Williams, 2001, Swing When You're Winning
Suzy Bogguss, 2003 - Swing
Gladys Knight, 2006, Before Me
Fiona Apple & Jon Brion, 2011 or earlier
Phil Collins again on his 2018 compilation Plays Well With Others with Quincy Jones.

References

Songs with music by Duke Ellington
Songs with lyrics by Bob Russell (songwriter)
Nina Simone songs
Al Hirt songs
Instrumentals
1940 songs
1944 singles